Münsingen Castle is a castle in the municipality of Münsingen of the Canton of Bern in Switzerland.

History
By the 12th century a castle was built in Münsingen town from which the Senn family ruled the town.  However, it was demolished by Bern in 1311.  A wooden outbuilding was built on the castle lands three years later, which later became the cantonal psychiatric clinic.  In 1550 the Schultheiss Hans Franz Nägeli rebuilt the castle building into its current appearance.  It was renovated and repaired in 1749–53.  In 1977 the municipality acquired the castle and converted it into a municipal museum.

The museum
The museum is open Friday and Sunday from October until April.  It contains two permanent exhibits as well as occasional temporary exhibits.  The first permanent exhibit focuses on the history of the town and on the Steiger family who lived in the castle for almost three centuries.  The second permanent exhibit focuses on the work of the famous puppeteer, Therese Keller (1923-1972) who was a pioneer in the puppet theater in Switzerland.

See also
 List of castles in Switzerland

References

External links

 Municipal website 

Castles in the Canton of Bern